Pseudochromis moorei, the jaguar dottyback, is a species of ray-finned fish from the Western Central Pacific Ocean, which is a member of the family Pseudochromidae.

Entymology
The fish is named in honor of John Percy Moore (1869-1965), of the University of Pennsylvania, wh was assistant curator at the Academy of Natural Sciences of Philadelphia and a specialist in leeches and their biological control.

References

moorei
Taxa named by Henry Weed Fowler
Fish described in 1931